Denise Infante (born 25 July 1982) is a former Chilean field hockey player.

Personal life
Infante studied and played hockey at the University of Maryland.

Career

College hockey
After graduating from Santiago College, Infante travelled to the United States and played hockey for the Maryland Terrapins. During her college career, Infante received a number of awards, including the Honda Sports Award for the 2005–06 and 2006–07 seasons, and the ACC Athlete of the Year award in 2006.

Las Diablas
Infante first represented the national team in 1999, making her first major appearance at the Pan American Games in Winnipeg.

Throughout her career, Infante medalled at two major tournaments, winning bronze at both the 2009 Pan American Cup in Hamilton and at the 2011 Pan American Games in Guadalajara.

Following a six-year hiatus from the national team, Infante returned to the squad in 2019 in an attempt to help the team qualify for the 2020 Summer Olympics in Tokyo.

References

1982 births
Living people
Chilean female field hockey players
Pan American Games medalists in field hockey
Pan American Games bronze medalists for Chile
Field hockey players at the 2011 Pan American Games
Sportspeople from Santiago
Medalists at the 2011 Pan American Games
20th-century Chilean women
21st-century Chilean women
Maryland Terrapins field hockey players